Elophila feili is a species of moth in the family Crambidae described by Wolfgang Speidel in 2002. It can be found in Spain and Portugal.

The ground colour of the adults is pale with a dark brown medial area. Adults are on wing in May and from August to September, probably in two generations per year.

References

Moths described in 2002
Moths of Europe
Acentropinae